Karel Vacek (born 9 September 2000) is a Czech racing cyclist, who currently rides for UCI ProTeam .

Major results

2017
 2nd Montichiari–Roncone
 4th Overall Course de la Paix Juniors
1st  Young rider classification
1st Stage 3
2018
 National Junior Road Championships
1st  Time trial
2nd Road race
 Giro della Lunigiana
1st Stage 1b (ITT) & Stage 3
 1st Trofeo Citta di Loano
 2nd Saarland Trofeo
 3rd Trofeo Emilio Paganessi
 4th G.P. Sportivi Sovilla-La Piccola Sanremo
 5th Overall Tour du Pays de Vaud 
 5th Road race, UEC European Junior Road Championships
 8th Overall Course de la Paix Juniors
1st Stage 3
2022
 7th Overall Grand Prix Jeseníky

References

External links

2000 births
Living people
Czech male cyclists
Sportspeople from Prague